Joan M. Jaykoski (February 3, 1933 – October 15, 2011) was an American outfielder and pitcher in the All-American Girls Professional Baseball League. Pitching for the Kenosha Comets in 1951, she was 1–3 in 10 games, allowing 26 earned runs and 44 walks in 30 innings of work. At the plate, she hit .214 with nine hits in 42 at-bats. For the Grand Rapids Chicks in 1952, she hit .024, collecting only one hit in 41 at-bats.

She was born with the surname Jaykowski, rather than Jaykoski.

References

1933 births
2011 deaths
People from Menasha, Wisconsin
Baseball players from Wisconsin
All-American Girls Professional Baseball League players
Kenosha Comets players
Grand Rapids Chicks players
21st-century American women